The 2019 Nigerian Senate election in Nasarawa State was held on February 23, 2019, to elect members of the Nigerian Senate to represent Nasarawa State. Umaru Tanko Al-Makura representing Nasarawa South, Abdullahi Adamu representing Nasarawa West and Godiya Akwashiki representing Nasarawa North all won on the platform of All Progressives Congress.

Overview

Summary

Results

Nasarawa South 
A total of 18 candidates registered with the Independent National Electoral Commission to contest in the election. APC candidate Umaru Tanko Al-Makura won the election, defeating PDP candidate, Suleiman Adokwe and 16 other party candidates. Al-Makura scored 113,156 votes, while  PDP candidate Adokwe scored 104,595 votes.

Nasarawa West
A total of 13 candidates registered with the Independent National Electoral Commission to contest in the election. APC candidate Abdullahi Adamu won the election, defeating PDP candidate Bala Ahmad Aliyu and 11 other party candidates. Adamu pulled 115,298 votes, while PDP candidate Aliyu scored 39,760.

Nasarawa North 
A total of 14 candidates registered with the Independent National Electoral Commission to contest in the election. APC candidate Godiya Akwashiki won the election, defeating PDP candidate, John Michael Abdul and 12 other party candidates. Akwashiki pulled 54,104 votes to defeat PDP candidate, John Michael Abdul who scored 48,133.

References 

Nasarawa State senatorial elections